Manually-Coded English (MCE) is a type of sign system that follows direct spoken English. The different codes of MCE vary in the levels of directness in following spoken English grammar. There may also be a combination with other visual clues, such as body language. MCE is typically used in conjunction with direct spoken English.

Manually-Coded English systems
MCE has been labeled many terms—including Signed English, Manually-Coded English, Sign Supported Speech, and Sign Supported English, none of which specify the degree to which the user is attempting to sign specific English vocabulary or correct grammar. MCE differs from  American Sign Language which has a very different grammar (including word order) than English. Deaf sign languages make use of spatial relationships, facial expression, and body positioning, while the degree to which a MCE-user incorporates these features depends on their proficiency in doing so. However, in an invented system such as Signing Exact English (SEE), the use of manual features is described in the first and subsequent issues of the SEE Dictionary and users must use facial expression, directionality, body position, emphasis and so forth to score well on certification tests such as the Educational Interpreter Performance Assessment and the Educational Sign Skills Evaluation.

Although there is no research to support the notion, many in the field of deaf education believe that comprehensibility of such MCE has been compromised in practice. Experience can improve the degree to which the information coded in English (morphologically as well as syntactically) is successfully communicated manually, and research in this regard can be found by searching Wikipedia for Signing Exact English. There is no research to suggest that those who are motivated to sign the complete grammar of English cannot do so if they learn the vocabulary, desire to sign proficient, grammatically-correct English, and are observed and coached to do so.

In English-speaking countries, it is common for users of Deaf sign languages to code-switch into a form of MCE when conversing with someone whose dominant language is English, or when quoting something from English. MCE is also sometimes favored by hearing people, for whom a manual version of their own language is much easier to learn than a deaf sign language.

In education
The different forms of manually coded English were originally developed for use in the education of deaf children, as their literacy in written English has been typically low compared to their hearing peers. This educational method was popularised by Abbé Charles-Michel de l'Epee who in the 1790s developed a method using hand-signs to teach a form of the French language to deaf children. Education is still the most common setting where manually coded English is used; not only with deaf students, but also children with other kinds of speech or language difficulties.

The use of MCE in deaf education is controversial. Contemporary deaf education can favor one of three streams – sign language, MCE, and oralism – or a combination of two or all three. Some opponents of MCE note that the use of MCE often occurs with an attempt to deny or replace the natural languages of the deaf community, which are seen as delaying the child's chances of acquiring of 'good English'. Conversely, these opponents argue, to deny a deaf child access to a natural sign language is to deny the child access to language in general – that exposing a deaf child to an awkward, unnatural coding of an oral language is no substitute for fundamental natural language acquisition – and that a child must be fully exposed to natural language early in order have the best command of any language later. (That is, a deaf child must be fully exposed to a sign language, and denying this exposure prevents the learning of language at the age when it is crucial for mental development.) Also, they argue that the supplanting of native languages is a form of colonialism. In the manualism vs. oralism debate, some forms of MCE are opposed by oralists who believe that even manual English lessens the motivation for children to learn to speak and speechread. Within the signing Deaf Community in the UK use of manually coded English in social settings outside of education is sometimes regarded as "old fashioned" and characteristic of older people (who grew up during the repression of sign languages in the educational system).

Types

Used globally

Fingerspelling

Fingerspelling uses 26 different signs to represent the 26 letters of the English alphabet. Every word is spelled as in written English, and as with written English, certain linguistic and paralinguistic elements such as intonation are not represented.

It is a very simple form of MCE for English speakers to learn, and is often the first 'point of contact' for a hearing person before learning a sign language. Fingerspelling is also used by Deaf people as a part of sign languages, for some proper nouns, or when quoting words or short phrases from English.

Exclusive fingerspelling is rarely used for extended communication, as it is a very slow method of representing English. It still has currency in some deafblind settings (see tactile signing). Exclusive fingerspelling has a place in the history of deaf education; in the US it is known as the Rochester Method (see below). Elderly deaf people in the UK and Australia may also use a lot of fingerspelling as a result of their education.

Note that different regions use different manual alphabets to represent English – a two-handed system is used in the UK, Australia and New Zealand, and one-handed systems are used in North America (see ASL alphabet), Ireland (see Irish Sign Language), Singapore and the Philippines. Both one and two handed alphabets are used in South Africa. 
These English-speaking countries do not all have the same sign language either. See .

Signed English
Different systems called 'Signed English' have been developed in Australia, New Zealand, Ireland, the UK, the US, Kenya, and South Africa. However each 'Signed English' has borrowed signs from the local deaf sign language and invented new signs to represent the words and grammar of English. They tend to follow a loose logic of sound rather than the strict phonetic structure of Cued Speech. For example, in Australian Signed English 'uncomfortable' is represented in signs meaning 'un', 'come', 'for', and 'table'.  A visual sign taken from a deaf sign language may be generalised to represent homonyms of the English word – for example, the Auslan sign for a 'fly' (insect) may be used in Signed English for the verb (to) 'fly'.

Signed English tends to be slower than spoken English, and teachers using it have usually found themselves 'cutting corners' and reverting to contact sign.

Contact sign

Not strictly a form of manually coded English, contact sign in fact is a blend of a local Deaf Sign Language and English. This contact language can take place anywhere on a continuum of intermediate stages, from very 'English-like' to very 'Deaf-language-like'; signers from these two different language backgrounds will often meet somewhere in the middle. Because of contact sign's standing as a bridge between two distinct languages, it is used differently by each individual depending on their knowledge of English and of the deaf sign language. The term contact sign has largely replaced the earlier name Pidgin Sign English (PSE) because this form of signing does not display the features linguists expect of a pidgin.

Contact sign drops the initializations and grammatical markers used in other forms of MCE, but retains basic English word order.  In the US, ASL features often seen in contact sign include the listing of grouped items and the repetition of some pronouns and verbs.

Sign-supported speech, or simultaneous communication

Sign-supported speech (SSS) involves voicing everything as in spoken English, while simultaneously signing a form of MCE. The vocabulary, syntax and pragmatics of English are used, with the MCE signing serving as a support for the reception of speech. Signs are borrowed from the local deaf sign language and/or are artificial signs invented by educators of the deaf.

The terms SSS and SimCom are now often used synonymously with total communication (TC), though the original philosophy of TC is quite different.

Cued speech

Cued Speech is unique among forms of MCE in that it does not use borrowed or invented signs in an attempt to convey English.  Instead, the American and British English versions of Cued Speech uses eight hand shapes – none of which are derived from sign languages – to represent consonant phonemes, and four hand placements around the face to represent vowel phonemes.  R. Orin Cornett, who developed Cued Speech in 1966 at Gallaudet University, sought to combat poor reading skills among deaf college students by providing deaf children with a solid linguistic background.  Cued Speech must be combined with mouthing (associated with the speaking of a language), as the hand shape, hand placement, and information on the mouth combine as unique feature bundles to represent phonemic values. Cues are not intended to be understood without mouthing, however, many deaf native cuers are able to decipher the cues alone without the use of the mouth. Similarly they tend to be able to perform well at deciphering the information on the mouth without the use of the hand (which is commonly referred to as lip reading).  Cued Speech has been adapted for languages and dialects around the world.

In North America

Signed English (SE) – American

The term 'Signed English' refers to a much simpler system than SEE1, SEE2, or LOVE. Signed English (occasionally referred to as Siglish) uses ASL signs in English word order, but only 14 grammatical markers.  The most common method of Signed English in the US is that created by Harry Bornstein, who worked on the Gallaudet Signed English Project to develop children's books written in both illustrated signs and written English.

Seeing essential English (SEE1)
Developed in the US in 1966 by a deaf teacher named David Anthony, Seeing Essential English (SEE1) was intended to teach proper grammatical construction by using signs borrowed from ASL but it implements English word order, and other grammatical markers, such as conjugation. SEE1 is occasionally referred to as Morphemic Sign System (MSS), and it has also been adapted in Poland into seeing essential Polish. Note:
SEE1/MSS has evolved to be more compatible with written and spoken English. Much of this has been under the guidance of Dr. Wanda Milburn and the Amarillo ISD.

Signing exact English (SEE2)

Signing exact English (SEE2) was developed by Gerilee Gustason, Esther Zawolkow, and Donna Pfetzing in the early 1970s. As an offshoot of SEE1, many features of SEE2 are identical to that code system. SEE2 is also used in Singapore. About 75% to 80% of SEE2 signs are either borrowed from ASL or are modified ASL signs.
Signing Exact English uses more markers than the 14 used in Signed English.

As there is no more formal use of SEE1, signing exact English is no longer referred to as SEE2, but rather SEE.

Linguistics of visual English (LOVE)
Developed by Dennis Wampler, LOVE is also quite similar to SEE1 in construction.  While most forms of ASL and MCE are transcribed using English glosses, LOVE is written using the notation system developed by William Stokoe.

Conceptually accurate signed English (CASE)
CASE, one of the more recently developed forms of MCE, combines the grammatical structure used in Signed English with the use of concepts rather than words, as is done in ASL.  It is becoming one of the more common forms of MCE, and has been used in both interpreter training programs and mainstreamed deaf education. The term Sign Supported English is sometimes used to refer to the same thing.

Rochester method
Perhaps the closest type of MCE to written English, the Rochester method involves fingerspelling every word.  It was originated by Zenas Westervelt in 1878, shortly after he opened the Western New York Institute for Deaf-Mutes (presently known as the Rochester School for the Deaf).  Use of the Rochester method continued until approximately the 1970s, and there are still deaf adults from the Rochester area who were taught with the Rochester method.  It has fallen out of favor because it is a tedious and time-consuming process to spell everything manually, though it is still used in some deafblind settings (see tactile signing).

In the United Kingdom

Signed English (SE) – British
Intending to use signs that would be readily understood by deaf children, British Signed English borrowed signs from British Sign Language and combined them with fingerspelling, as well as signs and markers invented by hearing educators, to give a manual representation of spoken English.

Sign-supported English (SSE)
Sign-supported English is the British equivalent of conceptually accurate signed English (see above). BSL signs are used in English grammar. As with PSE the balance of BSL signs to English varies greatly depending on the signer's knowledge of the two languages.

A single sign is often differentiated into a number of English words by clearly mouthing the word. Thus in order to comprehend SSE well, one needs good lipreading (speechreading) skills, as well as a good knowledge of English grammar.

Limited interpreting services are available in the UK for SSE.

National Signed English (NSE) is a recently promoted communication system that uses a combination of BSL and SSE. Its authors, the Open College of Sign Language (OCSL), claim it creates perfect syntax, present and past tenses and allows the user to communicate in word perfect English. Promotional literature for this proposed new system has generated considerable controversy in the UK Deaf Community and alarm among Sign Language Professionals because of remarks about British Sign Language by the charity's Operations Director styling it a "basic communication system".

Cued speech

Cued Speech is unique among forms of MCE in that it does not use borrowed or invented signs in an attempt to convey English. The American and British English versions of Cued Speech uses eight hand shapes – none of which are derived from sign languages – to represent consonant phonemes, and four hand placements around the face to represent vowel phonemes. British and American Cued Speech are very similar but not identical. Cued Speech must be combined with mouthing (associated with the speaking of a language), as the hand shape, hand placement, and information on the mouth combine as unique feature bundles to represent phonemic values. Cues are not intended to be understood without mouthing, however, many deaf native cuers are able to decipher the cues alone without the use of the mouth. Similarly they tend to be able to perform well at deciphering the information on the mouth without the use of the hand (which is commonly referred to as lip reading).

As of 2022, there are far fewer Cued Speech users than BSL and SSE users in the UK and a much lower percentage of deaf users than many other countries, however it is well established and is represented by the Cued Speech UK charity, based in Devon. Cued Speech has been adapted for languages and dialects around the world.

Paget Gorman sign system
The Paget Gorman Sign System, also known as Paget Gorman signed speech (PGSS) or Paget Gorman systematic sign language, was originated in Britain by Sir Richard Paget in the 1930s and developed further by Lady Grace Paget and Dr Pierre Gorman to be used with children with speech or communication difficulties, such as deaf children. It is a grammatical sign system which reflects normal patterns of English. The system uses 37 basic signs and 21 standard hand postures, which can be combined to represent a large vocabulary of English words, including word endings and verb tenses. The signs do not correspond to natural signs of the Deaf community.

The system was widespread in Deaf schools in the UK from the 1960s to the 1980s, but since the emergence of British Sign Language and the BSL-based Signed English in deaf education, its use is now largely restricted to the field of speech and language disorder.

Used elsewhere

Australasian signed English
In Australia, 'Signed English' was developed by a committee in the late 1970s, who took signs from Auslan (especially the southern dialect), invented new signs, and borrowed a number of signs from American Sign Language that have now made their way into everyday use in Auslan. It is still used in many schools. Australasian Signed English is also in use in New Zealand.

Singapore – SEE2
Signing Exact English (SEE2) is widely used in deaf schools in Singapore, and is taught as the preferred form of sign language by the Singapore Association for the Deaf.

Kenya Signed English
The Kenyan government uses Kenya Signed English, though the University of Nairobi backs Kenyan Sign Language.

See also
 Initialized sign
 Manually coded language
 Makaton

References and resources

 Paget Gorman Signed Speech Full Manual (1990). Northumberland: STASS Publications.
 Jeanes R. C., Reynolds, B. E. & Coleman, B. C. 1989 (Eds.), Dictionary of Australasian Signs (2nd Edition), Victorian College for the Deaf, 597 St Kilda Rd, Melbourne, Victoria 3004.
 Branson, Jan & Miller, Don (1998), Nationalism and the Linguistic Rights of Deaf Communities: Linguistic Imperialism and the Recognition and Development of Sign Languages., Journal of Sociolinguistics 2 (1), 3–34.
  Jeanes, R., Reynolds, B. & Coleman, B (Eds) (1989) Dictionary of Australasian Signs (2nd Edition), VSDC Melbourne

External links
Styles of Communication
Methods of Communication with the Deaf
Cued Speech Discovery
SEE Center for the Advancement of Deaf Children

English
Reordered languages
English language